Punola is a small village or hamlet in the North Goa sub-district or taluka of Bardez. It is near the village panchayat of Ucassaim, and St. Elizabeth's Church lies just outsides its boundaries.

Area and population
Punola has an area of 69.41 hectares, and 199 households. Its population is 864 persons, of whom 445 are male and 419 female. 95 residents are under six years old, 47 boys and 48 girls.

Jurisdiction
Punola is part of the Ucassaim-Paliem-Punola village panchayat.

Village or ward?
Some call Punola a ward (or vaddo) of Ucassaim but for census purposes, it is treated as a separate village.

Ucassaim
Ucassaim, according to an August 2017 write-up, is said to comprise village wards such as St Anthony Vaddo, Bela Flor, Souza Vaddo, Couto Vaddo, Dhumpem, Paliem 1, Paliem 2, Punola, Pelovaddo and Lourdes Vaddo.

References

Villages in North Goa district